The Arizona Wildcats football team competes in the National Collegiate Athletic Association (NCAA) Division I Football Bowl Subdivision, representing the University of Arizona. This is a list of completed seasons.

Seasons

References

Arizona Wildcats

Arizona Wildcats football